R v Rodgers, 2006 SCC 15, [2006] 1 S.C.R. 554, is a case decided by the Supreme Court of Canada on the constitutionality of the collection of blood samples from prisoners. The Court upheld the Criminal Code provision allowing for retroactive DNA samples of prisoners without notice.

Background
Dennis Rodgers was a convicted sex offender who was serving his sentence in an Ontario prison. Since Rodgers was sentenced before the enactment of the 1998 DNA Identification Act, his blood sample was not taken upon sentencing to be placed in the national database. Under the section 487.055(1)(c) of the Criminal Code, the Crown applied for an ex parte application for the DNA sample. Rodgers challenged the application on the basis that the enabling Code provision violated the rights within Canadian Charter of Rights and Freedoms.

Opinion of the Court
In a four to three decision the Court upheld the Code provisions. Justice Charron, writing for the majority found that the state's interest in his personal information was sufficient to outweigh Rodger's right to privacy. She noted that the DNA sample is akin to a finger print and will only be used for identification purposes. She also found that the provision is procedurally fair and was a clear articulation of the legislature's intent.

External links
 
 case summary

Canadian Charter of Rights and Freedoms case law
Supreme Court of Canada cases
2006 in Canadian case law
Canadian evidence case law
Canadian criminal procedure case law
Privacy case law